Corridors of Power or Power corridor may refer to centres of government or power authority as a phrase. It may also refer to:

 Corridors of Power (album), an album by Gary Moore
 Corridors of Power (novel), a novel by C.P. Snow
 Corridors of Power (TV series), an Australian television mockumentary comedy series
 Corridors of Power, a PC game running on the Retribution Engine